is a passenger railway station located in Aoba-ku, Yokohama, Kanagawa Prefecture, Japan, operated by the private railway company Tokyu Corporation.

Lines

Station layout 
The station consists of two opposed side platforms serving two tracks ith an elevated station building built over the platforms.

Platforms

History
Ichigao Station opened on April 1, 1966.

Passenger statistics
In fiscal 2019, the station was used by an average of 43,403 passengers daily. 

The passenger figures for previous years are as shown below.

Surrounding area
Aoba Ward Office
Ichigao Cave Tomb Cluster
Toin University of Yokohama

See also
 List of railway stations in Japan

References

External links

 

Railway stations in Kanagawa Prefecture
Railway stations in Japan opened in 1966
Railway stations in Yokohama